Almas is a municipality located in the Brazilian state of Tocantins. Its population was 6,979 (2020) and its area is 4,013 km².

The municipality contains part of the  Serra Geral do Tocantins Ecological Station, a strictly protected conservation unit created in 2001 to preserve an area of cerrado.

References

Municipalities in Tocantins